Megachile albiscopa is a species of bee in the family Megachilidae. It was described by Saussure in 1890.

References

Albiscopa
Insects described in 1890